Confederate Honey is a 1940 Merrie Melodies cartoon directed by Friz Freleng. It is a sendup of Gone with the Wind, and features an early appearance by Elmer Fudd in his most familiar form.

The cartoon's title is meant to evoke "Confederate money".

Plot
It is 1861 (B.Sea., that is "Before Seabiscuit"), and Colonel O'Hairoil, a literal blueblood in the literally bluegrass country of Kentucky, presides over rich tobacco and cotton plantations. His black slaves slowly pick the cotton one boll at a time, and when one young lad takes two bolls of cotton and hands them to his recumbent father to place in the packing crate, he is warned, "Don't get too ambitious there, son."

The pride of the plantation is the Colonel's daughter, Crimson O'Hairoil, who is courted by many suitors, who leave in vain after having their horse parking ticket validated (for parking is charged by the hour). Crimson has eyes only for the "chivalrous, hard riding, square shooting soldier of fortune, Ned Cutler." (Elmer Fudd). Ned arrives, and is just, with some difficulty, about to ask Crimson a question, when there is an explosion. The American Civil War has started. Ned must leave to join his "wegiment." He leaves his horse in the paid lot, despite the warning of the attendant.

The war drags on. The war is picketed on the grounds that it is unfair to the Union, while civilians are equipped with blue "Union suits" (uniforms). An officer addresses his men, warning that the other side is pitching Stoneball Jackson, "a southpaw" against them, and if they win, they will meet the South in the Cotton Bowl. A trumpeter sounds a call, but things degenerate into a jazz band. A nervous Confederate officer paces in a tent with information coming in by telegraph—it turns out to be race results. Ned shoots a cannon, whose ball acts like a pinball in a machine.

Meanwhile, the horse and attendant await Ned's return. The Colonel is dispirited to hear, on the radio, that "The Yanks" have won again, announced before a victory for Brooklyn (and all others rained out), and curses the Yankees.

Back at camp, Ned reads a letter and sighs. A signal rocket turns into an advertisement "After the battle eat Southern Fried Chicken at Mammy's Shack." Crimson, having promised to burn a light in the window for Ned, does so with such enthusiasm with a searchlight that she alarms Paul Revere, who rides away giving his famous warning.

Time passes (with the horse and attendant still in the lot) from 1861 to 1865, and the war ends.  Crimson looks out her window, strewn with the remains of candles. At last, Ned returns, and finally asks Crimson the question—can she validate his parking ticket? She stamps "REVOKED" across his forehead.

Reception
Motion Picture Exhibitor said on April 17, 1940: "By far the slap-happiest and most laugh-provoking reel of color cartoon ever put out by Leon Schlesinger (and that takes in a lot of territory). This take-off on Gone with the Wind had a projection room audience doubled up with laughter. It concerns the sad tale of Elmer Cutter, who is called to the colors before he has an opportunity to propose to Crimson O'Hair Oil. He does return, however, but he doesn't get the gal who waited patiently for him. Ah, Woe! Excellent."

Home media
Laserdisc - The Golden Age of Looney Tunes, Vol. 3, Side 8: The Evolution of Egghead
DVD - Errol Flynn Westerns Collection Virginia City (USA 1995 Turner print added as a bonus, censored)

References

External links

 Confederate Honey on the Internet Archive

1940 animated films
1940 short films
1940 films
Merrie Melodies short films
Warner Bros. Cartoons animated short films
Short films directed by Friz Freleng
1940 comedy films
American Civil War films
Films produced by Leon Schlesinger
Films scored by Carl Stalling
Films set in 1861
Films set in 1865
Films set in Kentucky
1940s Warner Bros. animated short films